USS Sterope (AK-96) was a  commissioned by the U.S. Navy for service in World War II. She was responsible for delivering troops, goods and equipment to locations in the war zone.

Construction
Originally named SS James Wilson (MC hull 183) after Founding Father James Wilson, she was laid down on 9 December 1941, by the Oregon Shipbuilding Co., Portland, Oregon; launched on 22 February 1942; sponsored by Mrs. John Spady; acquired by the Navy on 27 March 1943; and commissioned on 14 May 1943.

World War II Pacific Theatre operations 
Sterope was converted to Navy specifications by the Los Angeles Shipbuilding and Drydock Co., and completed her shakedown cruise on 10 June. The ship --- assigned to the Naval Transportation Service ---proceeded to San Francisco, California, loaded, and sailed on 24 June for New Caledonia. Sterope arrived at Noumea on 16 July 1943 and, for the next two years, shuttled supplies to advanced bases as a part of the Service Force, Pacific Fleet.
 
Highlights of her service came in July 1944, when she delivered supplies to American forces engaged in recapturing Guam and in May 1945 when she took supplies to troops fighting for Okinawa.

End-of-war operations 
Late in July 1945, Sterope headed for Pearl Harbor and the U.S. west coast. She reached San Francisco on 6 August and was undergoing overhaul there when the war ended. On 9 October 1945, the ship sailed for Guam and moved varied cargo among the islands of the Central Pacific for the next six months.

Post-war decommissioning 
Sterope arrived at Pearl Harbor on 18 April 1946 and was decommissioned there on 16 May. In August 1947, she was towed to San Francisco and returned to the Maritime Commission. Her name was struck from the Navy list on 19 November 1947.

Military awards and honors 
Sterope received two battle stars for World War II service. Her crew was eligible for the following medals:
 American Campaign Medal
 Asiatic-Pacific Campaign Medal (2)
 World War II Victory Medal

References

Bibliography

External links
 

 

Crater-class cargo ships
World War II auxiliary ships of the United States
Ships built in Portland, Oregon
1942 ships
Suisun Bay Reserve Fleet
Ships named for Founding Fathers of the United States